Schichau Seebeckwerft (often abbreviated SSW) was a German shipbuilding company, headquartered in Bremerhaven. The name comes from the 1988 merger of Schichau with Seebeckwerft.

History

The original company Schichau was founded in 1837 by Ferdinand Schichau in Elbing (Elbląg) as F. Schichau. It started by manufacturing steam engines and heavy equipment, later locomotives. In 1854 Schichau built a shipyard in Elbing. A new large shipyard in Danzig was opened in 1890 (later becoming a part of the Polish Gdańsk Shipyard after 1945). In 1929 the shipyard was bought by the German government. In 1930 the company also bought a small yard in Königsberg.

After 1945 shipyards in Danzig, Königsberg and Elbing were found on the Soviet and Polish territories, and the company restarted business in Bremerhaven in West Germany, merging with the Schiffbaugesellschaft Unterweser in 1972 to become Schichau Unterweser and with Seebeckwerft in 1988 to become Schichau Seebeckwerft. The company was then bought by Bremer Vulkan and initially closed in 1996. The new SSW Schichau Seebeck Shipyard GmbH, founded in 1998, was closed in 2009.

With its long history of major shipbuilding, the company is also known as Schichau-Werft, or Schichau Seebeck Shipyard (Werft meaning shipyard).

Ships built by Schichau Seebeckwerft (selection)

Civilian ships
 M/S BEWA Discoverer, (1974)
 M/S Pride of Free Enterprise, (1979)
 M/S Spirit of Free Enterprise, (1979)
 M/S Herald of Free Enterprise, (1980, sunk in 1987)
 M/S Olau Hollandia, (1989)
 M/S Olau Britannia, (1990)
 M/S European Pathway, (1991)
 M/S European Seaway, (1991)
 M/S European Highway, (1992)
 M/S Pride of Burgundy, (1993)
 M/S Superfast I, (1995)
 M/S Superfast II, (1995)

The following vessels are often cited as being built by Schichau Seebeckwerft, but were actually designed and built by A.G. Weser Seebeckwerft prior to the merger with Schichau Unterweser

M/S Olau Hollandia, (1981) 
M/S Olau Britannia, (1982)
M/S Peter Pan, (1986)
M/S Nils Holgersson, (1987)

References

External links

 Homepage of Schichau Seebeckwerft

Shipbuilding companies of Germany
German companies established in 1837
Defence companies of Germany
Defunct locomotive manufacturers of Germany
Manufacturing companies based in Bremen (state)
Companies based in Bremerhaven
Manufacturing companies established in 1837